Choceň is a railway station located in Choceň, Czech Republic. The station is located on the Kolín – Česká Třebová railway (Line 010), Choceň – Litomyšl railway (Line 018) and Choceň – Hradec Králové – Velký Osek railway (Line 020). The train services are operated by České dráhy. In June 2005, a two year refurbishment of the station was completed.

Train services
The following services currently call at the station:

Prague – Kolín – Pardubice – Ústí nad Orlicí – Česká Třebová – Brno
Kolín – Pardubice – Ústí nad Orlicí – Česká Třebová

References

External links

 Choceň Railway Station Webcam
 Choceň Railway Station Live Timetable

Railway stations in Pardubice Region
Railway stations opened in 1845
Railway stations opened in 1875
Anton Jüngling railway stations
Ústí nad Orlicí District
Railway stations in the Czech Republic opened in 1845